Amba (pl. Baamba and known by various other names) is a Bantu ethnic group located on the border area between the DRC and Uganda south of Lake Albert in the northern foothills of the Rwenzori Mountains.  On the Uganda side, they are found in Bundibugyo District.  On the Congolese side, they are located in the Watalinga and Bawisa subcounties of Beni, South Kivu.  Numbering 42,559 on the Uganda side in the 2014 census and 4,500 on the Congolese side according to a 1991 SIL International estimate, Ethnologue lists their total population as 40,100.  Agriculturalists, the Baamba traditionally cultivate plantains, millet, maize, sweet potatoes, peanuts, rice, coffee, cotton, and cassava, while raising goats and sheep. The Baamba practice Christianity.

The Amba language spoken by the Baamba is called, variously, Kwamba by the Baamba themselves and is known as Kihumu in the DR Congo.  There are many others. It has a 70% lexical similarity with Bera. Dialects include Kyanzi (Kihyanzi) and Suwa (Kusuwa).

The Baamba were part of the armed Rwenzururu movement against the Toro Kingdom and central government that reached heights in the mid-1960s and early 1980s.  In 2008, the government recognized the Kingdom of Rwenzururu, formed by the Amba and Konjo peoples, as Uganda's first kingdom shared by two tribes.

The Baamba are one of the 65 indigenous communities in Uganda according to the Third Schedule of Uganda´s Constitution (Uganda´s indigenous communities as at 1st February, 1926).

References 

Ethnic groups in the Democratic Republic of the Congo
Ethnic groups in Uganda